Joey's Seafood Restaurants (formerly Joey's Only) is a seafood restaurant chain in Canada.

The chain was started in Calgary, Alberta, Canada in 1985 by Joe Klassen. Franchising began in 1992 and has expanded to 39 franchise locations in North America and is the largest seafood restaurant chain in Canada.

See also

 List of seafood restaurants 
List of Canadian restaurant chains

References

External links
Official Website 

Restaurant chains in Canada
Seafood restaurants

1985 establishments in Alberta